Jonathan Myerson (born 12 January 1960 in Cardiff, Wales) is a British dramatist and novelist, writing principally for television and radio. His partner is novelist Julie Myerson.

Myerson's first play Making a Difference was commissioned by the Oxford Playhouse Company.  A subsequent work, Diary of a Nobody was written for the National Theatre.

His work includes Number 10, a five-part series for BBC Radio 4 about a fictional Prime Minister and his staff in Downing Street, including an episode in which Saint Helena is invaded by Angola.

His animated film of The Canterbury Tales was nominated for an Oscar (as animated short film) in 1999 and won the BAFTA Award for Best Animated Film in addition to four Emmys.

He has also written scripts for several British television drama series including The Bill, Holby City, EastEnders, Jupiter Moon and The Legend of William Tell as well as being involved in animation. He has written scripts for Testament: The Bible in Animation and The Canterbury Tales (as being head director and executive director) and voice directed Animated Tales of the World. In June 2017, Myerson's That was Then was broadcast in five parts as BBC Radio Four's 15 Minute Drama. His radio dramatizations include The Republicans, a suite of six plays about recent US presidents first broadcast in 2018.

Myerson is the author of two novels, Noise (1998) and Your Father (1999) and is a founding partner of The Writer's Practice, a literary consultancy.

He was a Labour councillor for Clapham Town Ward, Lambeth from 2002 to 2006

, he is the Course Director, MA in Creative Writing (Novels) at City University London's Journalism Department.

Family
He lives in South London with novelist Julie Myerson, and two of their three children, Chloe and Raphael. The family was secretly the subject of the "Living with Teenagers" column in The Guardian newspaper before later being identified. It was revealed in 2009 that their third child, Jake, had several years earlier been thrown out of the family home by the parents for smoking cannabis. Both he and his wife have been criticized for their lack of empathy and poor understanding of youth culture. In an article in The Guardian, Myerson reported that, upon hearing his son would achieve "A" grades at GCSE, he said: "He needs to fail one of these GCSEs. He needs to realise what he's doing."

External links
 Jonathan Myerson at the British Film Institute

References

1960 births
Living people
British male novelists
Labour Party (UK) councillors
Councillors in the London Borough of Lambeth
British television writers
Welsh television writers
British male television writers
British television directors
Welsh television directors
Welsh voice directors
Writers from Cardiff
British animated film directors
Welsh novelists
20th-century British novelists
20th-century British male writers